The 1975 Gulf Oil British League season was the 41st season of the top tier of speedway in the United Kingdom and the 11th season known as the British League.

Summary
The league was sponsored for the first time by Gulf Oil. Reading Racers returned after a one-season absence to increase the size of the league back to eighteen teams and the ban on Overseas riders that rode in other leagues abroad was lifted.

The Ipswich Witches won their first title, defeating Belle Vue Aces by a solitary point. John Louis and Billy Sanders scored heavily throughout the season for Ipswich. Belle Vue found consolation by winning the Knockout Cup.

In their last season at the Cowley track, Oxford Rebels won the Midland Cup, beating Wolverhampton Wolves

Final table
M = Matches; W = Wins; D = Draws; L = Losses; Pts = Total Points

British League Knockout Cup
The 1975 Speedway Star British League Knockout Cup was the 37th edition of the Knockout Cup for tier one teams. Belle Vue Aces were the winners.

First round

Second round

Quarter-finals

Semi-finals

Final

First leg

Second leg

Belle Vue Aces were declared Knockout Cup Champions, winning on aggregate 86-70.

Leading final averages

Riders & final averages
Belle Vue

 11.13
 9.27
 8.76
 7.14
 6.21
 5.03
 4.00
 3.55

Coventry

 8.66
 8.02
 5.37
 5.14
 4.82
 4.43
 4.36
 3.84
 2.23
 1.71

Cradley Heath

 8.73 
 8.58
 7.68 
 7.53 
 4.87 
 4.84
 4.56
 3.08

Exeter

 11.52
 9.19
 7.50
 6.07
 5.89
 5.71
 4.96
 4.72
 3.44

Hackney

 8.54 
 7.81
 7.61
 5.84
 4.68
 4.60
 4.46
 3.86

Halifax

 8.77
 8.03
 7.58 
 7.11
 5.92
 5.74
 4.89
 4.32
 3.83

Hull

 9.69
 7.29
 7.20
 6.64
 6.53
 5.22
 5.14
 5.10
 3.49
 3.45

Ipswich

 10.58 
 9.58 
 7.75
 6.44
 5.13
 4.99
 4.78
 4.00

King's Lynn

 8.87
 7.48
 7.43 
 6.20
 5.77
 5.76
 4.75
 4.56
 4.07
 4.00
 4.00

Leicester

 10.41
 9.90
 5.91
 5.84
 5.70
 4.93
 4.17
 3.75

Newport

 11.15
 8.98
 8.70
 7.32
 7.13
 6.34
 6.11
 3.26

Oxford

 10.04 
 8.41 
 7.48
 6.57
 5.73
 4.75
 4.15
 2.46

Poole

 10.41 
 7.50
 6.23
 5.39
 5.29
 4.48
 3.77
 2.53

Reading

 10.90 
 7.37
 7.06
 5.59
 5.56
 5.21
 4.99

Sheffield

 9.79
 9.37
 7.91
 6.41
 6.09
 5.88
 3.17

Swindon

 10.13
 8.26
 5.43
 4.95
 4.56
 4.42
 4.27
 3.18
 2.79

Wimbledon

 10.12
 9.23
 7.24
 6.11
 4.97
 4.85
 4.76
 4.40
 2.19

Wolverhampton

 10.79
 6.99
 6.29
 5.85
 4.55
 3.19
 3.16
 2.96

See also
List of United Kingdom Speedway League Champions
Knockout Cup (speedway)

References

British League
1975 in British motorsport
1975 in speedway